Mikhail Aleksandrovich Shubin (19 December 1944 – 13 May 2020) was a Russian mathematician and professor at Northeastern University, as well as a Fellow of the American Mathematical Society.  He died in May 2020 at the age of 75.

Work
Shubin has written over 140 papers and books, and supervised almost twenty doctoral theses.

In 2012 he became a fellow of the American Mathematical Society.

See also

Novikov–Shubin invariant

References

External links
 
 CV
 Conference Announcement

1944 births
2020 deaths
20th-century American mathematicians
21st-century American mathematicians
Fellows of the American Mathematical Society
Moscow State University alumni
Academic staff of Moscow State University
Northeastern University faculty
PDE theorists
Russian mathematicians